Lygropia aureomarginalis is a moth in the family Crambidae found in Cameroon. It was described by Max Gaede in 1916.

References

Moths described in 1916
Lygropia